The 1961 Notre Dame Fighting Irish football team represented the University of Notre Dame during the 1961 NCAA University Division football season.

Schedule

Team players drafted into the NFL
 1962 NFL Draft

References

Notre Dame
Notre Dame Fighting Irish football seasons
Notre Dame Fighting Irish football